Beta Ethniki 1985–86 complete season.

League table

Results

Play-offs

|+Relegation play-off

|}

Top scorers

References

External links
RSSSF.org

Second level Greek football league seasons
Greece
2